Soaring may refer to:
 Gliding, in which pilots fly unpowered aircraft known as gliders or sailplanes
 Lift (soaring), a meteorological phenomenon used as an energy source by some aircraft and birds
 Soaring (magazine), a magazine produced by the Soaring Society of America
 SOARING, a public artwork at Alverno College
 List of soaring birds
 Soarin', a ride in Walt Disney parks
 Soaring (album) a 1973 Big Band jazz album by Don Ellis

See also
Bird flight
Flying and gliding animals
Dynamic soaring
Ridge soaring
 Controllable slope soaring
 Orographic lift
 Thermals
 Lee waves